Palaeogiraffa is an extinct genus of giraffidae. It was first named by Bonis and Bouvrain in 2003, and contains one species, P. major. It has only been found at a fossil site in Yulafli, in Turkey.

References

External links 
 Paleogiraffa at the Paleobiology Database

Prehistoric giraffes
Prehistoric even-toed ungulate genera